This is a list of men's amateur Swedish swimming champions. The Swedish Swimming Championships (Swedish: Svenska Mästerskapen i simning, SM i simning, Sim-SM, Långbane-SM) are held annually in the Swedish summer in an outdoor 50m pool. The national championships are also trials for the Summer Olympics, World Championships and European Championships. Records go back to 1899 in freestyle, backstroke, breaststroke, butterfly, and various relays and IM competitions. This list was compiled from Historiska simtag: Svensk simidrott under hundra år, Solna: Svenska Simförbundet.

Current program

50 m freestyle

1983 – Per Holmertz, Stockholmspolisens IF
1984 – Bengt Baron, SK Korrugal
1985 – Per Johansson, Borlänge SS
1986 – Per Johansson, Borlänge SS
1987 – Göran Titus, Örebro SA
1988 – Göran Titus, Örebro SA
1989 – Göran Titus, Örebro SA
1990 – Lars-Ove Jansson, Upsala SS
1991 – Pär Lindström, Katrineholms SS
1992 – Pär Lindström, Katrineholms SS
1993 – Pär Lindström, Katrineholms SS
1994 – Lars-Ove Jansson, Upsala SS
1995 – Fredrik Letzler, Spårvägens SF
1996 – Pär Lindström, Upsala SS
1997 – Lars Frölander, Sundsvalls SS
1998 – Lars Frölander, Sundsvalls SS
1999 – John Miranda, Södertälje SS
2000 – John Miranda, Södertälje SS
2001 – Stefan Nystrand, Södertörns SS
2002 – Stefan Nystrand, Södertörns SS
2003 – Stefan Nystrand, Södertörns SS
2004 – Stefan Nystrand, Södertörns SS
2005 – Marcus Piehl, Linköpings ASS
2006 – Stefan Nystrand, Södertörns SS
2007 – Stefan Nystrand, Södertörns SS
2008 – Mathias Hageneier, SK Laxen
2009 – Stefan Nystrand, SK Neptun
2010 – Stefan Nystrand, SK Neptun
2011 – Petter Stymne, SK Neptun
2012 – Stefan Nystrand, Spårvägens SF
2013 – Petter Stymne, SK Neptun
2014 – Christoffer Carlsen, Mölndals ASS

100 m freestyle

1899 – Per Björkman, Upsala SS
1900 – Per Björkman, Upsala SS
1901 – Erik Eriksson, Stockholms KK
1902 – Hjalmar Johansson, Stockholms KK
1903 – Gunnar Wennerström, Stockholms KK
1904 – Gunnar Wennerström, Stockholms KK
1905 – Wilhelm Persson, Stockholms KK
1906 – Robert Andersson, Stockholms KK
1907 – Harald Julin, Stockholms KK
1908 – Harald Julin, Stockholms KK
1909 – Harald Julin, Stockholms KK
1910 – Robert Andersson, Stockholms KK
1911 – Harald Julin, Stockholms KK
1912 – Robert Andersson, Stockholms KK
1913 – Harald Julin, Stockholms KK
1914 – Robert Andersson, Stockholms KK
1915 – Kaj Hansen, Malmö SS
1916 – Kaj Hansen, Malmö SS
1917 – Ture Ågren, Malmö SS
1918 – Ture Ågren, Malmö SS
1919 – Ture Ågren, Malmö SS
1920 – Orvar Trolle, Malmö SS
1921 – Orvar Trolle, Malmö SS
1922 – Orvar Trolle, Malmö SS
1923 – Arne Borg, Stockholms KK
1924 – Arne Borg, Stockholms KK
1925 – Arne Borg, Stockholms KK
1926 – Georg Werner, SoIK Hellas
1927 – Arne Borg, Stockholms KK
1928 – Arne Borg, Stockholms KK
1929 – Arne Borg, Stockholms KK
1930 – Evert Jernström, SoIK Hellas
1931 – Sven Pettersson, SK Neptun
1932 – Sven Pettersson, SK Neptun
1933 – Sven Pettersson, SK Neptun
1934 – Sven Pettersson, SK Neptun
1935 – Sven Pettersson, SK Neptun
1936 – Sven Pettersson, SK Neptun
1937 – Per-Olof Olsson, SoIK Hellas
1938 – Björn Borg, Norrköpings KK
1939 – Per-Olof Olsson, SoIK Hellas
1940 – Björn Borg, Norrköpings KK
1941 – Per-Olof Olsson, SoIK Hellas
1942 – Per-Olof Olsson, SoIK Hellas
1943 – Per-Olof Olsson, SoIK Hellas
1944 – Per-Olof Olsson, SoIK Hellas
1945 – Per-Olof Olsson, SoIK Hellas
1946 – Per-Olof Olsson, SoIK Hellas
1947 – Per-Olof Olsson, SoIK Hellas
1948 – Per-Olof Olsson, SoIK Hellas
1949 – Per-Olof Olsson, SoIK Hellas
1950 – Göran Larsson, Stockholms KK
1951 – Göran Larsson, Stockholms KK
1952 – Göran Larsson, Stockholms KK
1953 – Göran Larsson, Stockholms KK
1954 – Göran Larsson, Stockholms KK
1955 – Hans Lindström, SK Neptun
1956 – Håkan Westesson, SK Poseidon
1957 – Göran Larsson, Simavdelningen 1902
1958 – Per-Ola Lindberg, SK Neptun
1959 – Per-Ola Lindberg, SK Neptun
1960 – Per-Ola Lindberg, SK Neptun
1961 – Per-Ola Lindberg, SK Neptun
1962 – Per-Ola Lindberg, SK Neptun
1963 – Per-Ola Lindberg, SK Neptun
1964 – Per-Ola Lindberg, SK Neptun
1965 – Lester Eriksson, SK Neptun
1966 – Lester Eriksson, SK Neptun
1967 – Göran Jansson, Filipstads SS
1968 – Lester Eriksson, SK Neptun
1969 – Gunnar Larsson, Malmö SS
1970 – Gunnar Larsson, Malmö SS
1971 – Göran Jansson, Stockholmspolisens IF
1972 – Bengt Gingsjö, Simavdelningen 1902
1973 – Bernt Zarnowiecki, Falu SS
1974 – Bernt Zarnowiecki, Falu SS
1975 – Bernt Zarnowiecki, Falu SS
1976 – Svante Rasmusson, Umeå SS
1977 – Dan Larsson, Sundsvalls SS
1978 – Per-Alvar Magnusson, Upsala SS
1979 – Per Wikström, Borlänge SS
1980 – Per Holmertz, Stockholmspolisens IF
1981 – Per Johansson, Borlänge SS
1982 – Per Johansson, Borlänge SS
1983 – Per Holmertz, Stockholmspolisens IF
1984 – Thomas Lejdström, Västerås SS
1985 – Tommy Werner, Karlskrona SS
1986 – Per Johansson, Borlänge SS
1987 – Tommy Werner, Karlskrona SS
1988 – Tommy Werner, Karlskrona SS
1989 – Tommy Werner, Karlskrona SS
1990 – Tommy Werner, Karlskrona SS
1991 – Anders Holmertz, Spårvägens SF
1992 – Tommy Werner, Karlskrona SS
1993 – Anders Holmertz, Spårvägens SF
1994 – Anders Holmertz, Spårvägens SF
1995 – Fredrik Letzler, Spårvägens SF
1996 – Anders Holmertz, Spårvägens SF
1997 – Lars Frölander, Sundsvalls SS
1998 – Lars Frölander, Sundsvalls SS
1999 – John Miranda, Södertälje SS
2000 – Lars Frölander, Sundsvalls SS
2001 – Lars Frölander, Sundsvalls SS
2002 – Lars Frölander, Linköpings ASS
2003 – Lars Frölander, Linköpings ASS
2004 – Eric la Fleur, Malmö KK
2005 – Jonas Persson, Malmö KK
2006 – Lars Frölander, Linköpings ASS
2007 – Petter Stymne, SK Neptun
2008 – Christoffer Wikström, Upsala S
2009 – Stefan Nystrand, SK Neptun
2010 – Jonas Persson, Malmö KK
2011 – Lars Frölander, Linköpings ASS
2012 – David Larsson, Uddevalla Sim
2013 – Oscar Ekström, Linköpings ASS
2014 – Christoffer Carlsen, Mölndals ASS

200 m freestyle

1915 – Robert Andersson, Stockholms KK
1916 – Robert Andersson, Stockholms KK
1917 – Robert Andersson, Stockholms KK
1918 – Robert Andersson, Stockholms KK
1919 – Robert Andersson, Stockholms KK
1920 – Arne Borg, Stockholms KK
1921 – Arne Borg, Stockholms KK
1922 – Arne Borg, Stockholms KK
1923 – Arne Borg, Stockholms KK
1924 – Åke Borg, Stockholms KK
1925 – Arne Borg, Stockholms KK
1926 – Eskil Lundahl, Malmö SS
1927 – Arne Borg, Stockholms KK
1928 – Arne Borg, Stockholms KK
1929 – Arne Borg, Stockholms KK
1930 – Sven Pettersson, SK Neptun
1931 – Sven Pettersson, SK Neptun
1932 – William Grut, SK Neptun
1933 – Georg Werner, Stockholms KK
1934 – Sven Pettersson, SK Neptun
1935 – Sven Pettersson, SK Neptun
1936 – Björn Borg, Norrköpings KK
1937 – Björn Borg, Norrköpings KK
1938 – Björn Borg, Norrköpings KK
1939 – Åke Julin, Stockholms KK
1940 – Björn Borg, Norrköpings KK
1941 – Björn Borg, Norrköpings KK
1942 – Bernt Lilja, Nyköpings SS
1943 – Rune Gustavsson, SoIK Hellas
1944 – Martin Lundén, SK Neptun
1945 – Martin Lundén, SK Neptun
1946 – Hans Johansson, Norrköpings KK
1947 – Olle Johansson, IF Elfsborg
1948 – Per-Olof Östrand, Hofors AIF
1949 – Per-Olof Östrand, Hofors AIF
1950 – Göran Larsson, Stockholms KK
1951 – Per-Olof Östrand, IF Elfsborg
1952 – Per-Olof Östrand, IF Elfsborg
1953 – Per-Olof Östrand, IF Elfsborg
1954 – Per-Olof Östrand, IF Elfsborg
1955 – Hans Lindström, SK Neptun
1956 – Håkan Westesson, SK Poseidon
1957 – Kristian König, SK Neptun
1958 – Willy Hemlin, Simavdelningen 1902
1959 – Bengt Nordvall, SK Neptun
1960 – Per-Ola Lindberg, SK Neptun
1961 – Per-Ola Lindberg, SK Neptun
1962 – Per-Ola Lindberg, SK Neptun
1963 – Jan Lundin, Stockholmspolisens IF
1964 – Mats Svensson, IF Elfsborg
1965 – Lester Eriksson, SK Neptun
1966 – Ingvar Eriksson, Sundsvalls SS
1967 – Lester Eriksson, SK Neptun
1968 – Lester Eriksson, SK Neptun
1969 – Gunnar Larsson, Malmö SS
1970 – Gunnar Larsson, Malmö SS
1971 – Gunnar Larsson, Malmö SS
1972 – Bengt Gingsjö, Simavdelningen 1902
1973 – Bernt Zarnowiecki, Falu SS
1974 – Bengt Gingsjö, Simavdelningen 1902
1975 – Bengt Gingsjö, Simavdelningen 1902
1976 – Peter Pettersson, SK Laxen
1977 – Per Holmertz, Motala SS
1978 – Per Holmertz, Motala SS
1979 – Per Wikström, Borlänge SS
1980 – Michael Söderlund, Karlskrona SS
1981 – Michael Söderlund, Karlskrona SS
1982 – Thomas Lejdström, Västerås SS
1983 – Michael Söderlund, Karlskrona SS
1984 – Anders Holmertz, Motala SS
1985 – Anders Holmertz, Motala SS
1986 – Anders Holmertz, Motala SS
1987 – Tommy Werner, Karlskrona SS
1988 – Anders Holmertz, Motala SS
1989 – Anders Holmertz, Motala SS
1990 – Anders Holmertz, Motala SS
1991 – Anders Holmertz, Spårvägens SF
1992 – Anders Holmertz, Spårvägens SF
1993 – Anders Holmertz, Spårvägens SF
1994 – Anders Holmertz, Spårvägens SF
1995 – Anders Holmertz, Spårvägens SF
1996 – Anders Holmertz, Spårvägens SF
1997 – Anders Lyrbring, Kungälvs SS
1998 – Anders Lyrbring, Kungälvs SS
1999 – Anders Lyrbring, Mölndals ASS
2000 – Max von Bodungen, Malmö KK
2001 – Anders Lyrbring, Mölndals ASS
2002 – Jonas Persson, Malmö KK
2003 – Jonas Persson, Malmö KK
2004 – Jonas Persson, Malmö KK
2005 – Jonas Persson, Malmö KK
2006 – Jonas Persson, Malmö KK
2007 – Christoffer Wikström, Upsala SS

400 m freestyle

1930 – Georg Svensson, SoIK Hellas
1931 – Georg Svensson, SoIK Hellas
1932 – William Grut, SK Neptun
1933 – Georg Svensson, SoIK Hellas
1934 – Sten-Olof Bolldén, Stockholms KK
1935 – William Grut, SK Neptun
1936 – Björn Borg, Norrköpings KK
1937 – Björn Borg, Norrköpings KK
1938 – Björn Borg, Norrköpings KK
1939 – Åke Julin, Stockholms KK
1940 – Björn Borg, Norrköpings KK
1941 – Björn Borg, Norrköpings KK
1942 – Bernt Lilja, Nyköpings SS
1943 – Gunnar Hellström, Norrköpings KK
1944 – Björn Borg, Norrköpings KK
1945 – Olle Johansson, IF Elfsborg
1946 – Rune Gustavsson, SoIK Hellas
1947 – Per-Olof Östrand, Hofors AIF
1948 – Per-Olof Östrand, Hofors AIF
1949 – Per-Olof Östrand, Hofors AIF
1950 – Per-Olof Östrand, Hofors AIF
1951 – Per-Olof Östrand, Hofors AIF
1952 – Per-Olof Östrand, Hofors AIF
1953 – Per-Olof Östrand, Hofors AIF
1954 – Per-Olof Östrand, Hofors AIF
1955 – Per-Olof Östrand, Hofors AIF
1956 – Willy Hemlin, Simavdelningen 1902
1957 – Lars Eriksson, SoIK Hellas
1958 – Willy Hemlin, Simavdelningen 1902
1959 – Lars-Erik Bengtsson, SK Neptun
1960 – Lars-Erik Bengtsson, SK Neptun
1961 – Sten Ekman, Tunafors SK
1962 – Hans Rosendahl, Katrineholms SS
1963 – Jan Lundin, Stockholmspolisens IF
1964 – Hans Rosendahl, Katrineholms SS
1965 – Lester Eriksson, SK Neptun
1966 – Jan Lundin, Stockholmspolisens IF
1967 – Sven von Holst, Stockholms KK
1968 – Gunnar Larsson, Malmö SS
1969 – Gunnar Larsson, Malmö SS
1970 – Gunnar Larsson, Malmö SS
1971 – Gunnar Larsson, Malmö SS
1972 – Gunnar Larsson, Malmö SS
1973 – Anders Bellbring, Limhamns SS
1974 – Peter Pettersson, SK Laxen
1975 – Bengt Gingsjö, Simavdelningen 1902
1976 – Peter Pettersson, SK Laxen
1977 – Gary Andersson, Kristianstads SLS
1978 – Gary Andersson, Kristianstads SLS
1979 – Magnus Pettersson, Jönköpings SS
1980 – Thomas Lejdström, Västerås SS
1981 – Thomas Lejdström, Västerås SS
1982 – Thomas Lejdström, Västerås SS
1983 – Thomas Lejdström, Västerås SS
1984 – Anders Holmertz, Motala SS
1985 – Anders Holmertz, Motala SS
1986 – Anders Holmertz, Motala SS
1987 – Anders Holmertz, Motala SS
1988 – Anders Holmertz, Motala SS
1989 – Anders Holmertz, Motala SS
1990 – Anders Holmertz, Motala SS
1991 – Anders Holmertz, Spårvägens SF
1992 – Anders Holmertz, Spårvägens SF
1993 – Anders Holmertz, Spårvägens SF
1994 – Anders Holmertz, Spårvägens SF
1995 – Anders Holmertz, Spårvägens SF
1996 – Anders Holmertz, Spårvägens SF
1997 – Jonas Lundström, Sundsvalls SS
1998 – Petter Lindh, Jönköpings SS
1999 – Mikael E. Rosén, Sundvalls SS
2000 – Patrik Svensson, Malmö KK
2001 – Johan Claar, Jönköpings SS
2002 – Michael Jacobsson, Täby Sim
2003 – Peter Edvardsson, SK Neptun
2004 – Peter Edvardsson, SK Neptun
2005 – Peter Edvardsson, SK Neptun
2006 – Pierre Roger, Väsby SS
2007 – Christoffer Wikström, Upsala SS

800 m freestyle

1983 – Karl-Erik Elias, Linköpings ASS
1984 – Anders Holmertz, Motala SS
1985 – Anders Holmertz, Motala SS
1986 – Anders Holmertz, Motala SS
2001 – Magnus Fredriksson, Norrköpings KK
2002 – Michael Jacobsson, Täby Sim
2003 – Fredrik Gustafsson, Malmö KK
2004 – Johan Claar, Jönköpings SS
2005 – Johan Claar, Jönköpings SS
2006 – Johan Claar, Jönköpings SS
2006 – Johan Claar, Jönköpings SS
2007 – Johan Claar, Jönköpings SS

1500 m freestyle

1915 – Vilhelm Anderson, SK Neptun
1916 – Hedley Norell, Stockholms KK
1917 – Gunnar Walldén, Örebro SS
1918 – Vilhelm Andersson, SK Delfin
1919 – Vilhelm Andersson, SK Delfin
1920 – Arne Borg, Stockholms KK
1921 – Arne Borg, Stockholms KK
1922 – Arne Borg, Stockholms KK
1923 – Arne Borg, Stockholms KK
1924 – Åke Borg, Stockholms KK
1925 – Åke Borg, Stockholms KK
1926 – Hilding Björck, SK Neptun
1927 – Arne Borg, Stockholms KK
1928 – Arne Borg, Stockholms KK
1929 – Curt Atterday, SoIK Hellas
1930 – Georg Svensson, SoIK Hellas
1931 – Georg Svensson, SoIK Hellas
1932 – William Grut, SK Neptun
1933 – Georg Svensson, SoIK Hellas
1934 – Runar Juhlin, Eskilstuna SS
1934 – Werner Sjögren, Eskilstuna SS
1935 – William Grut, SK Neptun
1936 – Gunnar Klingberg, Stockholms KK
1937 – Björn Borg, Norrköpings KK
1938 – Björn Borg, Norrköpings KK
1939 – Björn Borg, Norrköpings KK
1940 – Björn Borg, Norrköpings KK
1941 – Björn Borg, Norrköpings KK
1942 – Torsten Jansson, Upsala SS
1943 – Torsten Jansson, Upsala SS
1944 – Torsten Jansson, Upsala SS
1945 – Bror-Ebbe Andersson, IF Elfsborg
1946 – Bror-Ebbe Andersson, IF Elfsborg
1947 – Bror-Ebbe Andersson, IF Elfsborg
1948 – Per-Olof Östrand, IF Elfsborg
1949 – Per-Olof Östrand, IF Elfsborg
1950 – Curt Abrahamsson, Stockholms KK
1951 – Per-Olof Östrand, IF Elfsborg
1952 – Per-Olof Östrand, IF Elfsborg
1953 – Per-Olof Östrand, IF Elfsborg
1954 – Per-Olof Östrand, IF Elfsborg
1955 – Willy Hemlin, Norrköpings KK
1956 – Willy Hemlin, Norrköpings KK
1957 – Leif Wolmsten, SK Neptun
1958 – Willy Hemlin, Simavdelningen 1902
1959 – Lars-Erik Bengtsson, SK Neptun
1960 – Lars-Erik Bengtsson, SK Neptun
1961 – Sten Ekman, Tunafors SK
1962 – Lars-Erik Bengtsson, SK Neptun
1963 – Hans Rosendahl, Katrineholms SS
1964 – Hans Rosendahl, Katrineholms SS
1965 – Peter Feil, Eskilstuna SS
1966 – Glen Bengtsson, Simavdelningen 1902
1967 – Peter Feil, Eskilstuna SS
1968 – Peter Feil, Eskilstuna SS
1969 – Sven von Holst, Stockholms KK
1970 – Gunnar Larsson, Malmö SS
1971 – Anders Bellbring, Upsala SS
1972 – Anders Bellbring, Upsala SS
1973 – Anders Bellbring, Upsala SS
1974 – Peter Pettersson, SK Laxen
1975 – Peter Pettersson, SK Laxen
1976 – Gary Andersson, Norrköpings KK
1977 – Gary Andersson, Kristianstads SLS
1978 – Stefan Andersson, Tunafors SK
1979 – Magnus Petersson, Jönköpings SS
1980 – Thomas Lejdström, Västerås SS
1981 – Thomas Lejdström, Västerås SS
1982 – Karl-Erik Elias, Linköpings ASS
1983 – Karl-Erik Elias, Linköpings ASS
1984 – Anders Holmertz, Motala SS
1985 – Anders Holmertz, Motala SS
1986 – Anders Holmertz, Motala SS
1987 – Stefan Persson, Malmö KK
1988 – Stefan Persson, Malmö KK
1989 – Stefan Persson, Malmö KK
1990 – Stefan Persson, Malmö KK
1991 – Anders Holmertz, Spårvägens SF
1992 – Ola Strömberg, Malmö KK
1993 – Jonas Lundström, Södertälje SS
1994 – Jonas Lundström, Södertälje SS
1995 – Jonas Lundström, Södertälje SS
1996 – Ola Strömberg, Upsala SS
1997 – Jonas Lundström, Sundsvalls SS
1998 – Mikael E. Rosén, Sundvalls SS
1999 – Mikael E. Rosén, Sundvalls SS
2000 – Mathias Olshed, SK Sydsim
2001 – Johan Claar, Jönköpings SS
2002 – Hannes Kohnke, Malmö KK
2003 – Johan Claar, Jönköpings SS
2004 – Johan Claar, Jönköpings SS
2005 – Johan Claar, Jönköpings SS
2006 – Johan Claar, Jönköpings SS
2007 – Johan Claar, Jönköpings SS

50 m backstroke

1994 – Daniel Lönnberg, Karlskrona SS
1995 – Daniel Lönnberg, Växjö SS
1996 – Mathias Ohlin, Trelleborgs SS
1998 – Daniel Carlsson, Väsby SS
1999 – Mathias Ohlin, Trelleborgs SS
2000 – Mathias Ohlin, Trelleborgs SS
2001 – Eric la Fleur, Malmö KK
2002 – Eric la Fleur, Malmö KK
2003 – Eric la Fleur, Malmö KK
2004 – Eric la Fleur, Malmö KK
2005 – Pontus Renholm, Stockholmspolisens IF
2006 – Jens Pettersson, Stockholms KK
2007 – Pontus Renholm, Stockholmspolisens IF

100 m backstroke

1910 – Harald Julin, Stockholms KK
1911 – Harald Julin, Stockholms KK
1912 – Harald Julin, Stockholms KK
1913 – Harald Julin, Stockholms KK
1914 – Harald Julin, Stockholms KK
1915 – Artur Rothstein, Malmö SS
1916 – Harald Julin, Stockholms KK
1917 – Harald Julin, Stockholms KK
1918 – Per Holmström, SK Delfin
1919 – Per Holmström, SK Delfin
1920 – Per Holmström, SK Delfin
1921 – Per Holmström, SK Delfin
1922 – Per Holmström, SK Delfin
1923 – Arne Borg, Stockholms KK
1924 – Per Holmström, Simavdelningen 1902
1925 – Roland Johansson, Norrköpings KK
1926 – Roland Johansson, Norrköpings KK
1927 – Roland Johansson, Norrköpings KK
1928 – Roland Johansson, Norrköpings KK
1929 – Eskil Lundahl, SoIK Hellas
1930 – Lars Lundvik, Limhamns SS
1931 – Lars Lundvik, Limhamns SS
1932 – Lars Lundvik, Limhamns SS
1933 – Lars Lundvik, Limhamns SS
1934 – Eskil Lundahl, SoIK Hellas
1935 – Lars Lundvik, Limhamns SS
1936 – Per Carleson, Stockholms KK
1937 – Sven Särne, Västerviks SS
1938 – Björn Borg, Norrköpings KK
1939 – Björn Borg, Norrköpings KK
1940 – Björn Borg, Norrköpings KK
1941 – Björn Borg, Norrköpings KK
1942 – Per-Olof Olsson, SoIK Hellas
1943 – Bertil Persson, SK Ran
1944 – Per-Olof Olsson, SoIK Hellas
1945 – Bertil Persson, SK Ran
1946 – Bertil Persson, SK Ran
1947 – Bertil Persson, SK Ran
1948 – Bertil Persson, SK Ran
1949 – Göran Larsson, Stockholms KK
1950 – Göran Larsson, Stockholms KK
1951 – Göran Larsson, Stockholms KK
1952 – Göran Larsson, Stockholms KK
1953 – Göran Larsson, Stockholms KK
1954 – Göran Larsson, Stockholms KK
1955 – Göran Larsson, Simavdelningen 1902
1956 – Hans Andersson, Tunafors SK
1957 – Hans Andersson, Tunafors SK
1958 – Bengt Olof Almstedt, Örebro SS
1959 – Ulf-Göran Johansson, IF Elfsborg
1960 – Bengt Olof Almstedt, Örebro SS
1965 – Hans Tegeback, Sundsvalls SS
1966 – Hans Tegeback, Sundsvalls SS
1967 – Hans Tegeback, Sundsvalls SS
1968 – Hans Tegeback, Sundsvalls SS
1969 – Hans Tegeback, Sundsvalls SS
1970 – Hans Tegeback, Sundsvalls SS
1971 – Svante Zetterlund, Karlskoga SS
1972 – Anders Sandberg, Eskilstuna SS
1973 – Svante Zetterlund, Karlskoga SS
1974 – Svante Zetterlund, Karlskoga SS
1975 – Mikael Brandén, Stockholmspolisens IF
1976 – Jan Thorell, Stockholmspolisens IF
1977 – Jan Thorell, Stockholmspolisens IF
1978 – Jan Thorell, Stockholmspolisens IF
1979 – Bengt Baron, Finspångs SK
1980 – Bengt Baron, SK Korrugal
1981 – Bengt Baron, SK Korrugal
1982 – Bengt Baron, SK Korrugal
1983 – Bengt Baron, SK Korrugal
1984 – Bengt Baron, SK Korrugal
1985 – Bengt Baron, SK Korrugal
1986 – Hans Fredin, Södertörns SS
1987 – Hans Fredin, Södertörns SS
1988 – Niklas Håkansson, Stockholmspolisens IF
1989 – Niklas Håkansson, Stockholmspolisens IF
1990 – Niklas Håkansson, Stockholmspolisens IF
1991 – Rudi Dollmayer, SK Ran
1992 – Zsolt Hegemgi, Jönköpings SS
1993 – Daniel Lönnberg, Karlskrona SS
1994 – Daniel Lönnberg, Karlskrona SS
1995 – Daniel Lönnberg, Växjö SS
1996 – Pär Gustafsson, Ängelholms SS
1997 – Mattias Ohlin, Trelleborgs SS
1998 – Mattias Ohlin, Trelleborgs SS
1999 – Mattias Ohlin, Trelleborgs SS
2000 – Mattias Ohlin, Trelleborgs SS
2001 – Daniel Lönnberg, Sundsvalls SS
2002 – Jens Petersson, Stockholms KK
2003 – Jens Petersson, Stockholms KK
2004 – Jens Petersson, Stockholms KK
2005 – Pontus Renholm, Stockholmspolisens IF
2006 – Pierre Roger, Väsby SS
2007 – Konstantin Sundin, Spårvägens SF

200 m backstroke

1961 – Bengt-Olov Almstedt, Örebro SS
1962 – Bengt-Olov Almstedt, Örebro SS
1963 – Jan Lundin, Stockholmspolisens IF
1964 – Leif Sjöblom, SK Neptun
1965 – Olle Ferm, Norrköpings KK
1966 – Olle Ferm, Norrköpings KK
1967 – Hans Ljungberg, Bromma SS
1968 – Hans Ljungberg, Bromma SS
1969 – Gunnar Larsson, Malmö SS
1970 – Gunnar Larsson, Malmö SS
1971 – Svante Zetterlund, Karlskoga SS
1972 – Anders Sandberg, Eskilstuna SS
1973 – Leif Ericsson, Upsala SS
1974 – Leif Ericsson, Upsala SS
1975 – Mikael Brandén, Stockholmspolisens IF
1976 – Leif Ericsson, Upsala SS
1977 – Jan Thorell, Stockholmspolisens IF
1978 – Jan Thorell, Stockholmspolisens IF
1979 – Michael Söderlund, Karlskrona SS
1980 – Michael Söderlund, Karlskrona SS
1981 – Michael Söderlund, Karlskrona SS
1982 – Bengt Baron, SK Korrugal
1983 – Michael Söderlund, Karlskrona SS
1984 – Michael Söderlund, Karlskrona SS
1985 – Michael Söderlund, Karlskrona SS
1986 – Hans Fredin, Södertörns SS
1987 – Hans Fredin, Södertörns SS
1988 – Jan Bidrman, Malmö KK
1989 – Anders Kroon, Upsala SS
1990 – Niklas Håkansson, Stockholmspolisens IF
1991 – Anders Kroon, Upsala SS
1992 – Pär Gustafsson, Ängelholms SS
1993 – Martin Svensson, Jönköpings SS
1994 – Fredrik Lundin, Malmö KK
1995 – Pär Gustafsson, Ängelholms SS
1996 – Pär Gustafsson, Ängelholms SS
1997 – Michael Jacobsson, Täby Sim
1998 – Mathias Ohlin, Trelleborgs SS
1999 – Michael Jacobsson, Täby Sim
2000 – Michael Jacobsson, Täby Sim
2001 – Michael Jacobsson, Täby Sim
2002 – Michael Jacobsson, Täby Sim
2003 – Michael Jacobsson, Täby Sim
2004 – Sten-Olof Gustafsson, Malmö KK
2005 – Pontus Renholm, Stockholmspolisens IF
2006 – Pierre Roger, Väsby SS
2007 – Konstantin Sundin, Spårvägens SF

50 m breaststroke

1993 – Patrik Robertsson, Södertälje SS
1994 – Patrik Robertsson, Södertälje SS
1995 – Patrik Robertsson, Södertälje SS
1996 – Jens Johansson, Sundsvalls SS
1998 – Jens Johansson, Sundsvalls SS
1999 – Jens Johansson, Sundsvalls SS
2000 – Patrik Isaksson, Västerås SS
2001 – Patrik Isaksson, Västerås SS
2002 – Martin Gustavsson, Malmö KK
2003 – Martin Gustavsson, Malmö KK
2004 – Martin Gustavsson, Malmö KK
2005 – Martin Gustavsson, Malmö KK
2006 – Martin Gustavsson, Malmö KK
2007 – Jonas Andersson, SK Neptun

100 m breaststroke

1948 – Bo Larsson, Västerås SS
1953 – Bo Larsson, Västerås SS
1961 – Roland Lundin, SK Ran
1962 – Roland Lundin, SK Ran
1963 – Roland Lundin, SK Ran
1964 – Håkan Kindblom, Västerås SS
1965 – Tomas Jonsson, Skövde SS
1966 – Tomas Jonsson, Skövde SS
1967 – Tomas Jonsson, Skövde SS
1968 – Tomas Jonsson, Skövde SS
1969 – Tomas Jonsson, Skövde SS
1970 – Tomas Jonsson, Skövde SS
1971 – Göran Eriksson, SK Najaden
1972 – Anders Häggqvist, Timrå AIF
1973 – Göran Eriksson, SK Najaden
1974 – Glen Christiansen, SK Najaden
1975 – Glen Christiansen, Simavdelningen 1902
1976 – Anders Norling, Stockholmspolisens IF
1977 – Glen Christiansen, Simavdelningen 1902
1978 – Jan Sjöström, IFK Lidingö
1979 – Peter Berggren, Skärets SS
1980 – Peter Berggren, Skärets SS
1981 – Hans Bergqvist, Sundsvalls SS
1982 – Peter Berggren, Skärets SS
1983 – Peter Berggren, Skärets SS
1984 – Peter Berggren, Skärets SS
1985 – Peter Berggren, Skärets SS
1986 – Henrik Tagesson, Örebro SA
1987 – Peter Berggren, Skärets SS
1988 – Jan Stensson, Upsala SS
1989 – Jan Stensson, Upsala SS
1990 – Peter Karlsson, Västerås SS
1991 – Jan Stensson, Upsala SS
1992 – Anders Bengtsson, SK Triton
1993 – Michael Alpfors, Malmö KK
1994 – Peter Karlsson, Västerås SS
1995 – Stefan Scherling, Spårvägens SF
1996 – Jens Johansson, Sundsvalls SS
1997 – Jens Johansson, Sundsvalls SS
1998 – Patrik Isaksson, Västerås SS
1999 – Jens Johansson, Sundsvalls SS
2000 – Martin Gustavsson, Malmö KK
2001 – Martin Gustavsson, Malmö KK
2002 – Martin Gustavsson, Malmö KK
2003 – Martin Gustavsson, Malmö KK
2004 – Martin Gustavsson, Malmö KK
2005 – Martin Gustavsson, Malmö KK
2006 – Martin Gustavsson, Malmö KK
2007 – Jonas Andersson, SK Neptun

200 m breaststroke

1914 – Thor Henning, SK Neptun
1915 – Thor Henning, SK Neptun
1916 – Arthur Rothstein, Malmö SS
1917 – Thor Henning, SK Neptun
1918 – Håkan Malmroth, Örebro SS
1919 – Thor Henning, SK Neptun
1920 – Thor Henning, SK Neptun
1921 – Thor Henning, SK Neptun
1922 – Håkan Malmroth, Örebro SS
1923 – Erik Andersson, Simavdelningen 1902
1924 – Bengt Linders, Stockholms KK
1925 – Bengt Linders, Stockholms KK
1926 – Bengt Linders, Stockholms KK
1927 – Erik Harling, Stockholms KK
1928 – Erik Harling, Stockholms KK
1929 – Erik Harling, Stockholms KK
1930 – Erik Harling, Stockholms KK
1931 – Erik Harling, Stockholms KK
1932 – Erik Harling, Stockholms KK
1933 – Sigfrid Heyner, Stockholms KK
1934 – Sigfrid Heyner, Stockholms KK
1935 – Erik Harling, Stockholms KK
1936 – Vilgot Johansson, Kalmar SS
1937 – John Rothman, Stockholms KK
1938 – John Rothman, Stockholms KK
1939 – John Rothman, Stockholms KK
1940 – John Rothman, Stockholms KK
1941 – John Rothman, Stockholms KK
1942 – Gunnar Sulling, SoIK Hellas
1943 – Rune Hellgren, SoIK Hellas
1944 – John Rothman, Stockholms KK
1945 – John Rothman, Stockholms KK
1946 – Bo Larsson, Västerås SS
1947 – John Rothman, Stockholms KK
1948 – John Rothman, Stockholms KK
1949 – John Rothman, Stockholms KK
1950 – John Rothman, Stockholms KK
1951 – Bo Larsson, Västerås SS
1952 – Bo Larsson, Västerås SS
1953 – Bo Eriksson, SoIK Hellas
1954 – Sven Gunnar Karlsson, Norrköpings KK
1955 – Sven Gunnar Karlsson, Norrköpings KK
1956 – Sven Gunnar Karlsson, Norrköpings KK
1957 – Rolf Junefelt, Jönköpings SLS
1958 – Tommie Lindström, Stockholmspolisens IF
1959 – Tommie Lindström, Stockholmspolisens IF
1960 – Tommie Lindström, Stockholmspolisens IF
1961 – Tommie Lindström, Stockholmspolisens IF
1962 – Roland Lundin, SK Ran
1963 – Ulf Ericsson, Katrineholms SS
1964 – Björn Finsson, Stockholmspolisens IF
1965 – Thomas Jonsson, Skövde SS
1966 – Thomas Jonsson, Skövde SS
1967 – Thomas Jonsson, Skövde SS
1968 – Thomas Jonsson, Skövde SS
1969 – Thomas Jonsson, Skövde SS
1970 – Thomas Jonsson, Skövde SS
1971 – Thomas Jonsson, Skövde SS
1972 – Tomas Kensén, Karlskoga SS
1973 – Anders Norling, Stockholmspolisens IF
1974 – Stefan Andersson, Nyköpings SS
1975 – Glen Christiansen, Simavdelningen 1902
1976 – Anders Norling, Stockholmspolisens IF
1977 – Glen Christiansen, Simavdelningen 1902
1978 – Glen Christiansen, Simavdelningen 1902
1979 – Peter Berggren, Skärets SS
1980 – Peter Berggren, Skärets SS
1981 – Peter Berggren, Skärets SS
1982 – Peter Berggren, Skärets SS
1983 – Peter Berggren, Skärets SS
1984 – Peter Berggren, Skärets SS
1985 – Peter Berggren, Skärets SS
1986 – Anders Peterson, Mariestads SS
1987 – Anders Stensson, Hagfors SS
1988 – Jan Bidrman, Malmö KK
1989 – Jan Bidrman, Malmö KK
1990 – Joakim Adolfsson, Norrköpings KK
1991 – Magnus Leth, SK Poseidon
1992 – Michael Alpfors, Malmö KK
1993 – Fredrik Rosenholm, Spårvägens SF
1994 – Peter Karlsson, Västerås SS
1995 – Fredrik Rosenholm, Spårvägens SF
1996 – Fredrik Rosenholm, Spårvägens SF
1997 – Fredrik Rosenholm, Spårvägens SF
1998 – Peter Aronsson, Spårvägens SF
1999 – Christian Clausen, Trelleborgs SS
2000 – Martin Gustavsson, Malmö KK
2001 – Martin Gustavsson, Malmö KK
2002 – Martin Gustavsson, Malmö KK
2003 – Martin Gustavsson, Malmö KK
2004 – Martin Gustavsson, Malmö KK
2005 – Martin Gustavsson, Malmö KK
2006 – Martin Gustavsson, Malmö KK
2007 – Jonas Andersson, SK Neptun

50 m butterfly

1994 – Jan Karlsson, Borlänge SS
1995 – Jonas Åkesson, Södertälje SS
1996 – Jonas Åkesson, Södertälje SS
1998 – Lars Frölander, Sundsvalls SS
1999 – Dan Lindström, Trelleborgs SS
2000 – Daniel Carlsson, Väsby SS
2001 – Lars Frölander, Sundsvalls SS
2002 – Lars Frölander, Linköpings ASS
2003 – Lars Frölander, Linköpings ASS
2004 – Lars Frölander, Linköpings ASS
2005 – Lars Frölander, Linköpings ASS
2006 – Lars Frölander, Linköpings ASS
2007 – Lars Frölander, Linköpings ASS

100 m butterfly

1949 – Bo Larsson, Västerås SS
1950 – Bengt Rask, Stockholms KK
1951 – Bengt Rask, Stockholms KK
1952 – Bo Larsson, Västerås SS
1965 – Ingvar Eriksson, Sundsvalls SS
1967 – Ingvar Eriksson, Sundsvalls SS
1968 – Ingvar Eriksson, Sundsvalls SS
1969 – Bo Westergren, Stockholmspolisens IF
1970 – Bo Westergren, Stockholmspolisens IF
1971 – Hans Ljungberg, Timrå AIF
1972 – Per Berglund, Stockholms Spårvägar
1973 – Per Berglund, Stockholms Spårvägar
1974 – Bob Casting, Stockholms Spårvägar
1975 – Bengt Gingsjö, Simavdelningen 1902
1976 – Pär Arvidsson, Finspångs SK
1977 – Tommy Lindell, Stockholmspolisens IF
1978 – Pär Arvidsson, Finspångs SK
1979 – Tommy Lindell, Stockholmspolisens IF
1980 – Pär Arvidsson, SK Korrugal
1981 – Pär Arvidsson, SK Korrugal
1982 – Bengt Baron, SK Korrugal
1983 – Pär Arvidsson, SK Korrugal
1984 – Bengt Baron, SK Korrugal
1985 – Thomas Lejdström, Västerås SS
1986 – Thomas Lejdström, Västerås SS
1987 – Thomas Lejdström, Västerås SS
1988 – Christer Wallin, Mölndals ASS
1989 – Christer Wallin, Mölndals ASS
1990 – Jonas Lögdberg, Täby Sim
1991 – Rudi Dollmayer, SK Ran
1992 – Jonas Lögdberg, Täby Sim
1993 – Lars Frölander, Borlänge SS
1994 – Gustaf Johansson, SK Neptun
1995 – Johan Setterberg, Mölndals ASS
1996 – Johan Setterberg, Mölndals ASS
1997 – Lars Frölander, Sundsvalls SS
1998 – Lars Frölander, Sundsvalls SS
1999 – Lars Frölander, Sundsvalls SS
2000 – Lars Frölander, Sundsvalls SS
2001 – Lars Frölander, Sundsvalls SS
2002 – Lars Frölander, Linköpings ASS
2003 – Lars Frölander, Linköpings ASS
2004 – Erik Andersson, Trollhättans SS
2005 – Erik Andersson, Trollhättans SS
2006 – Lars Frölander, Linköpings ASS
2007 – Lars Frölander, Linköpings ASS

200 m butterfly

1949 – Bengt Rask, Stockholms KK
1950 – Bengt Rask, Stockholms KK
1951 – Bengt Rask, Stockholms KK
1952 – Bengt Rask, Stockholms KK
1953 – Jan Olof Larsson, Malmö SS
1954 – Bo Larsson, SK Neptun
1955 – Bo Larsson, SK Neptun
1956 – Bo Larsson, SK Neptun
1957 – Hans-Erik Malmberg, Simavdelningen 1902
1958 – Willy Hemlin, Simavdelningen 1902
1959 – Håkan Bengtsson, Stockholmspolisens IF
1960 – Håkan Bengtsson, Stockholmspolisens IF
1961 – Håkan Bengtsson, Stockholmspolisens IF
1962 – Håkan Bengtsson, Stockholmspolisens IF
1963 – Ingvar Eriksson, Sundsvalls SS
1964 – Ingvar Eriksson, Sundsvalls SS
1965 – Peter Feil, Eskilstuna SS
1966 – Peter Feil, Eskilstuna SS
1967 – Ingvar Eriksson, Sundsvalls SS
1968 – Peter Feil, Eskilstuna SS
1969 – Anders Bellbring, Upsala SS
1970 – Peter Feil, Eskilstuna SS
1971 – Bengt Gingsjö, Simavdelningen 1902
1972 – Bengt Gingsjö, Simavdelningen 1902
1973 – Anders Bellbring, Limhamns SS
1974 – Anders Bellbring, Simavdelningen 1902
1975 – Anders Bellbring, Simavdelningen 1902
1976 – Pär Arvidsson, Finspångs SK
1977 – Ove Nylén, Kumla SS
1978 – Pär Arvidsson, Finspångs SK
1979 – Ove Nylén, Kristianstads SLS
1980 – Pär Arvidsson, SK Korrugal
1981 – Thomas Lejdström, Västerås SS
1982 – Pär Arvidsson, SK Korrugal
1983 – Pär Arvidsson, SK Korrugal
1984 – Thomas Lejdström, Västerås SS
1985 – Thomas Lejdström, Västerås SS
1986 – Jan Bidrman, Malmö KK
1987 – Jan Bidrman, Malmö KK
1988 – Christer Wallin, Mölndals ASS
1989 – Christer Wallin, Mölndals ASS
1990 – Jan Bidrman, Malmö KK
1991 – Gustaf Johansson, SK Neptun
1992 – Jan Bidrman, Malmö KK
1993 – Gustaf Johansson, Stockholmspolisens IF
1994 – Gustaf Johansson, SK Neptun
1995 – Fredrik Lundin, Ystads SS
1996 – Fredrik Lundin, Ystads SS
1997 – Fredrik Lundin, SK Neptun
1998 – Joakim Dahl, Landskrona SS
1999 – Carl Gårdmark, Ystads SS
2000 – Tero Välimaa, SK Neptun
2001 – Tero Välimaa, SK Neptun
2002 – Tero Välimaa, SK Neptun
2003 – Tero Välimaa, SK Neptun
2004 – Jonatan Dahlberg, SK Neptun
2005 – Simon Sjödin, Södertörns SS
2006 – Pierre Roger, Väsby SS
2007 – Simon Sjödin, Södertörns SS

200 m individual medley

1965 – Hans Ljungberg, SK Neptun
1966 – Hans Ljungberg, Bromma SS
1967 – Hans Ljungberg, Bromma SS
1968 – Hans Ljungberg, Bromma SS
1969 – Gunnar Larsson, Malmö SS
1970 – Gunnar Larsson, Malmö SS
1971 – Gunnar Larsson, Malmö SS
1972 – Gunnar Larsson, Malmö SS
1973 – Gunnar Larsson, Malmö SS
1974 – Anders Bellbring, Simavdelningen 1902
1975 – Bengt Gingsjö, Simavdelningen 1902
1976 – Bengt Svensson, Upsala SS
1977 – Bengt Svensson, Upsala SS
1978 – Gary Andersson, Kristianstads SLS
1979 – Gary Andersson, Kristianstads SLS
1980 – Mikael Örn, Ystads SS
1981 – Bengt Baron, SK Korrugal
1982 – Anders Peterson, Mariestads SS
1983 – Anders Peterson, Mariestads SS
1984 – Anders Peterson, Mariestads SS
1985 – Anders Peterson, Mariestads SS
1986 – Anders Peterson, Mariestads SS
1987 – Anders Peterson, Mariestads SS
1988 – Jan Bidrman, Malmö KK
1989 – Jan Bidrman, Malmö KK
1990 – Jan Bidrman, Malmö KK
1991 – Anders Peterson, Upsala SS
1992 – Jan Bidrman, Malmö KK
1993 – Anders Holmertz, Spårvägens SF
1994 – Daniel Karlsson, Täby Sim
1995 – Anders Holmertz, Spårvägens SF
1996 – Anders Holmertz, Spårvägens SF
1997 – Michael Jacobsson, Täby Sim
1998 – Michael Jacobsson, Täby Sim
1999 – Michael Jacobsson, Täby Sim
2000 – Michael Jacobsson, Täby Sim
2001 – Jesper Levander, Södertörns SS
2002 – Michael Jacobsson, Täby Sim
2003 – Michael Jacobsson, Täby Sim
2004 – Axel Pettersson, SK Neptun
2005 – Axel Pettersson, SK Neptun
2006 – Erik Samuelsson, Väsby SS
2007 – Erik Samuelsson, Väsby SS

400 m individual medley

1961 – Jan Lundin, Stockholmspolisens IF
1962 – Sten Ekman, Tunafors SK
1963 – Jan Lundin, Stockholmspolisens IF
1964 – Olle Ferm, Norrköpings KK
1965 – Olle Ferm, Norrköpings KK
1966 – Peter Feil, Eskilstuna SS
1967 – Hans Ljungberg, Bromma SS
1968 – Hans Ljungberg, Bromma SS
1969 – Hans Ljungberg, Bromma SS
1970 – Gunnar Larsson, Malmö SS
1971 – Gunnar Larsson, Malmö SS
1972 – Bengt Gingsjö, Simavdelningen 1902
1973 – Anders Bellbring, Limhamns SS
1974 – Bengt Gingsjö, Simavdelningen 1902
1975 – Bengt Gingsjö, Simavdelningen 1902
1976 – Leif Ericsson, Upsala SS
1977 – Gary Andersson, Kristianstads SLS
1978 – Gary Andersson, Kristianstads SLS
1979 – Thomas Lejdström, Västerås SS
1980 – Thomas Lejdström, Västerås SS
1981 – Thomas Lejdström, Västerås SS
1982 – Thomas Lejdström, Västerås SS
1983 – Anders Peterson, Mariestads SS
1984 – Anders Peterson, Mariestads SS
1985 – Anders Peterson, Mariestads SS
1986 – Jan Bidrman, Malmö KK
1987 – Jan Bidrman, Malmö KK
1988 – Jan Bidrman, Malmö KK
1989 – Jan Bidrman, Malmö KK
1990 – Jan Bidrman, Malmö KK
1991 – Fredrik Lundin, Ystads SS
1992 – Jan Bidrman, Malmö KK
1993 – Fredrik Lundin, Malmö KK
1994 – Fredrik Lundin, Malmö KK
1995 – Pär Gustafsson, Ängelholms SS
1996 – Daniel Karlsson, Täby Sim
1997 – Michael Jacobsson, Täby Sim
1998 – Michael Jacobsson, Täby Sim
1999 – Michael Jacobsson, Täby Sim
2000 – Michael Jacobsson, Täby Sim
2001 – Michael Jacobsson, Täby Sim
2002 – Michael Jacobsson, Täby Sim
2003 – Michael Jacobsson, Täby Sim
2004 – Axel Pettersson, SK Neptun
2005 – Axel Pettersson, SK Neptun
2006 – Erik Samuelsson, Väsby SS
2007 – Erik Samuelsson, Väsby SS

4×100 m freestyle relay

1916 – Malmö SS
1917 – Malmö SS
1918 – Malmö SS
1919 – Malmö SS
1920 – Stockholms KK
1921 – Malmö SS
1922 – Malmö SS
1923 – Stockholms KK
1924 – Stockholms KK
1925 – Stockholms KK
1926 – Malmö SS
1927 – Stockholms KK
1928 – Stockholms KK
1929 – Stockholms KK
1930 – SoIK Hellas
1931 – SK Neptun
1932 – SK Neptun
1933 – SK Neptun
1934 – SK Neptun
1935 – SK Neptun
1936 – SK Neptun
1937 – SoIK Hellas
1938 – Stockholms KK
1939 – SoIK Hellas
1940 – Stockholms KK
1941 – SoIK Hellas
1942 – SoIK Hellas
1943 – SoIK Hellas
1944 – SK Neptun
1945 – SK Neptun
1946 – SoIK Hellas
1947 – SoIK Hellas
1948 – SK Neptun
1949 – SoIK Hellas
1950 – IF Elfsborg
1967 – SK Neptun
1968 – SK Neptun
1969 – Stockholmspolisens IF
1970 – Stockholmspolisens IF
1971 – Timrå AIF
1972 – Timrå AIF
1973 – Simavdelningen 1902
1974 – Simavdelningen 1902
1975 – Simavdelningen 1902
1976 – Simavdelningen 1902
1977 – Kristianstads SLS
1978 – Kristianstads SLS
1979 – Borlänge SS
1980 – Borlänge SS
1981 – Borlänge SS
1982 – Borlänge SS
1983 – Borlänge SS
1984 – Upsala SS
1985 – Karlskrona SS
1986 – Borlänge SS
1987 – Upsala SS
1988 – Borlänge SS
1989 – Upsala SS
1990 – Karlskrona SS
1991 – Karlskrona SS
1992 – Södertälje SS (Marcus Lundstedt, Patric Robertsson, Peter Haraldsson, Jonas Åkesson)
1993 – Södertälje SS (Marcus Lundstedt, Patric Robertsson, Peter Haraldsson, Jonas Åkesson)
1994 – Upsala SS
1995 – Borlänge SS
1996 – Upsala SS
1997 – Sundsvalls SS
1998 – Sundsvalls SS (Johan Nyström, Mikael E. Rosén, Nicklas Öhman, Lars Frölander)
1999 – SK Neptun (Dan Cornelius, Anders Forsberg, Johan Wallberg, Marcus Fahlén)
2000 – Sundsvalls SS (Johan Nyström, Lars Frölander, Daniel Lönnberg, Johan Backlund)
2001 – Trelleborgs SS
2002 – Linköpings ASS (Marcus Piehl, Lars Frölander, Erik Dorch, Rickard Piehl)
2003 – Malmö KK (Eric la Fleur, Jonas Persson, Marcus Andersson, Max von Bodungen)
2004 – Linköpings ASS (Marcus Piehl, Lars Frölander, Hans Albrektsson, Rickard Piehl)
2005 – Linköpings ASS (Marcus Piehl, Lars Frölander, Erik Dorch, Hans Albrektsson)
2006 – Linköpings ASS (Marcus Piehl, Lars Frölander, Kristoffer Johansson, Hans Albrektsson)
2007 – SK Neptun (Stefan Nystrand, Petter Stymne, Axel Pettersson, Pontus Flodqvist)

4×200 m freestyle relay

1952 – IF Elfsborg
1953 – IF Elfsborg
1954 – SK Poseidon
1955 – SK Neptun
1956 – Simavdelningen 1902
1957 – SK Neptun
1958 – SK Neptun (Per-Olof Eriksson, Leif Wolmsten, Bengt Nordvall, Per-Ola Lindberg)
1959 – SK Neptun (Per-Olof Eriksson, Lars-Erik Bengtsson, Leif Wolmsten, Bengt Nordvall)
1960 – SK Neptun (Bengt Nordvall, Per-Olof Eriksson, Lars-Erik Bengtsson, Per-Ola Lindberg)
1961 – SK Neptun (Per-Olof Eriksson, Leif Wolmsten, Per-Ola Lindberg, Lars-Erik Bengtsson)
1962 – SK Neptun (Bengt Nordvall, Leif Wolmsten, Lars-Erik Bengtsson, Per-Ola Lindberg)
1963 – SK Neptun
1964 – SK Neptun
1965 – SK Neptun
1966 – Stockholmspolisens IF
1967 – SK Neptun
1968 – SK Neptun
1969 – Stockholms KK
1970 – Simavdelningen 1902
1971 – Upsala SS
1972 – Timrå AIF
1973 – Simavdelningen 1902
1974 – Simavdelningen 1902
1975 – Simavdelningen 1902
1976 – Simavdelningen 1902
1977 – Kristianstads SLS
1978 – Kristianstads SLS
1979 – Upsala SS
1980 – Västerås SS
1981 – Västerås SS
1982 – Borlänge SS
1983 – Kristianstads SLS
1984 – Kristianstads SLS
1985 – Karlskrona SS
1986 – Upsala SS
1987 – Malmö KK
1988 – Malmö KK
1989 – Malmö KK
1990 – SK Neptun
1991 – Karlskrona SS
1992 – Karlskrona SS
1993 – Spårvägens SF
1994 – Spårvägens SF
1995 – Spårvägens SF
1996 – Spårvägens SF
1997 – Sundsvalls SS
1998 – Sundsvalls SS (Mikael E. Rosén, Johan Nyström, Lars Frölander, Jonas Lundström)
1999 – Malmö KK (Patrik Svensson, Max von Bodungen, Fredrik Engdahl, Martin Gustavsson)
2000 – SK Neptun (Tero Välimaa, Peter Edvardsson, Dan Cornelius, Johan Wallberg)
2001 – SK Neptun
2002 – Malmö KK (Jonas Persson, Marcus Andersson, Hannes Kohnke, Martin Gustavsson)
2003 – SK Neptun (Jonatan Dahlberg, Tero Välimaa, Peter Edvardsson, Petter Stymne)
2004 – SK Neptun (Jonatan Dahlberg, Axel Pettersson, Petter Stymne, Peter Edvardsson)
2005 – Malmö KK (Marcus Andersson, Jonas Persson, Martin Gustavsson, Tobias Lindbom)
2006 – Malmö KK (Marcus Andersson, Jonas Persson, Martin Gustavsson, Tobias Lindbom)
2007 – Malmö KK (Tobias Lindbom, Jonas Persson, Sten-Olof Gustafsson, Martin Persson)

4×100 m medley relay

1949 – Stockholms KK
1950 – Stockholms KK
1951 – Stockholms KK
1952 – Stockholms KK
1953 – Stockholms KK
1954 – SK Poseidon
1955 – SK Neptun
1956 – Simavdelningen 1902
1957 – Simavdelningen 1902
1958 – SoIK Hellas (Lars Eriksson, Lennart Fröstad, Bo Larsson, Per-Olof Östrand)
1959 – Malmö SS (Lars Eriksson, Junot Delcomyn, Jan Olof Larsson, Björn Billquist)
1960 – Stockholmspolisens IF (Jan Lundin, Tommie Lindström, Håkan Bengtsson, Bert Svensson)
1961 – Stockholmspolisens IF (Jan Lundin, Tommie Lindström, Håkan Bengtsson, Bert Svensson)
1962 – SK Neptun
1963 – Stockholmspolisens IF
1964 – SK Neptun
1965 – Sundsvalls SS
1966 – Stockholmspolisens IF
1967 – Stockholmspolisens IF
1968 – Sundsvalls SS
1969 – Simavdelningen 1902
1970 – Sundsvalls SS
1971 – Timrå AIF
1972 – Simavdelningen 1902
1973 – Karlskoga SS
1974 – Spårvägens SF
1975 – Simavdelningen 1902
1976 – Stockholmspolisens IF
1977 – Stockholmspolisens IF
1978 – Stockholmspolisens IF
1979 – Kristianstads SLS
1980 – Stockholmspolisens IF
1981 – Stockholmspolisens IF
1982 – SK Korrugal (Bengt Baron, Tommy Pettersson, Pär Arvidsson, Anders Nordström)
1983 – SK Korrugal (Bengt Baron, Tommy Pettersson, Pär Arvidsson, Anders Nordström)
1984 – SK Korrugal (Bengt Baron, Tommy Pettersson, Pär Arvidsson, Anders Nordström)
1985 – SK Korrugal (Bengt Baron, Tommy Pettersson, Pär Arvidsson, Anders Nordström)
1986 – Stockholmspolisens IF
1987 – Helsingborgs SS (Nils Liedberg, Ola Lundblad, Anders Rasmusson, Viktor Olsson)
1988 – Malmö KK
1989 – Stockholmspolisens IF
1990 – Stockholmspolisens IF
1991 – Karlskrona SS
1992 – Karlskrona SS
1993 – Spårvägens SF
1994 – Spårvägens SF
1995 – Spårvägens SF
1996 – Ängelholms SS
1997 – Sundsvalls SS
1998 – SK Neptun (Stefano Prestinoni, Ilia Mikhailov, Johan Setterberg, Johan Wallberg)
1999 – Trelleborgs SS (Mattias Ohlin, Christian Clausen, Dan Lindström, Jonas Tilly)
2000 – Sundsvalls SS (Daniel Lönnberg, Jens Johansson, Lars Frölander, Johan Nyström)
2001 – Sundsvalls SS
2002 – Malmö KK (Fredrik Engdahl, Martin Gustavsson, Andreas Lentonsson, Eric la Fleur)
2003 – Malmö KK (Eric la Fleur, Martin Gustavsson, Patrik Johansson, Jonas Persson)
2004 – Malmö KK (Eric la Fleur, Martin Gustavsson, Andreas Lentonsson, Jonas Persson)
2005 – Malmö KK (Sten-Olof Gustafsson, Martin Gustavsson, Joakim Dahl, Jonas Persson)
2006 – Malmö KK (Sten-Olof Gustafsson, Martin Gustavsson, Marcus Andersson, Jonas Persson)
2007 – SK Neptun (Petter Stymne, Jonas Andersson, Axel Pettersson, Stefan Nystrand)

Discontinued events

500 m freestyle

1000 m freestyle

1 mile freestyle

5000 m freestyle

250 m breaststroke

400 m breaststroke

4×50 m medley

3×100 m medley

4×50 m medley

Life saving

References
Alm, B. (2004). Historiska simtag: Svensk simidrott under hundra år, Solna: Svenska Simförbundet

Swimming competitions in Sweden
Swimming Championships champions